Schizoptera is a plant genus in the family Asteraceae.

Species
There is only one accepted species, Schizoptera peduncularis, native to Peru and Ecuador.

References

Monotypic Asteraceae genera
Heliantheae
Flora of South America
Taxa named by Nikolai Turczaninow
Plants described in 1851